"The Hopes of President Xi", also known as "To Be an Upright Man for a Lifetime", is a song written by Chinese leader Xi Jinping and composed by Yanhui Jiang.

The song is sung by detainees in the Xinjiang internment camps.

See also
 "General Secretary Xi Jinping's Kindness We Never Forget"

References

External links
 【HD】陶紅-堂堂正正一輩子(習主席寄語)MV Offiicial Music Video官方完整版  (sung by Tao Hong)

Xi Jinping
Chinese songs
Year of song missing